Eutypella is a genus of fungi in the family Diatrypaceae.

Species
 Eutypella quaternata
 Eutypella sorbi
 Eutypella stellulata

References

Xylariales